The 1905 All-Western college football team consists of American football players selected to the All-Western teams chosen by various selectors for the 1905 Western Conference football season.

All-Western selections

Ends
 Mark Catlin Sr., Chicago (CA, CC, CDN, CEJ, CP, CRH, CT, ECP-1, MJ, JHR)
 Bobby Marshall, Minnesota (CC, CDN, CP, CT, ECP-1, JHR, MJ) (CFHOF)
 James Irving Bush, Wisconsin (CA, ECP-2)
 Homer Thomas, Purdue (CRH)
 Benton J. Bloom, Indiana (CEJ)
 John Garrels, Michigan (ECP-2)

Tackles
 Wilson Bertke, Minnesota (CA, CC, CDN, CEJ, CP, CRH, CT, ECP-1, JHR, MJ)
 Joe Curtis, Michigan (CA, CDN, CEJ, CP, CRH, CT, ECP-1)
 William "Bill" Ittner, Minnesota (CEJ [guard], ECP-1 [guard] JHR, MJ)
 Art Badenoch, Chicago (ECP-2)
 Percy P. Brush, Minnesota (ECP-2)

Guards
 Henry Schulte, Michigan (CA, CC, CDN, CP, CRH, ECP-1, JHR, MJ)
 Walter D. Graham, Michigan (CC, CP, CT, ECP-2, JHR, MJ)
 Merrill C. Meigs, Chicago (CDN)
 Theodore Vita, Minnesota (CA)
 Melville Archibald Hill, Chicago (CC [tackle], CT)
 Louis Donovan, Wisconsin (CRH, ECP-2)
 E. P. King, Purdue (CEJ)

Centers
 Germany Schulz, Michigan (CC, CDN, CEJ, CP, CRH, CT, ECP-2, JHR, MJ) (CFHOF)
 Richard W. Remp, Wisconsin (CA)
 Burton Pike Gale, Chicago (ECP-1)

Quarterbacks
 Walter Eckersall, Chicago (CA, CC, CDN, CEJ, CP, CRH, CT, ECP-1, JHR, MJ) (CFHOF)
 Arthur Melzner, Wisconsin (ECP-2)

Halfbacks
 Thomas S. Hammond, Michigan (CA, CC, CDN, CEJ, CP, CRH, CT, ECP-1, JHR, MJ)
 Albion G. Findlay, Wisconsin (CA, CC, CDN, CEJ, CP, CRH, CT, ECP-1, JHR, MJ)
 Leo DeTray, Chicago (ECP-2)
 Joseph Cutting, Minnesota (ECP-2)

Fullbacks
 Hugo Bezdek, Chicago (CA, CC, CDN, CEJ, CP, CRH, CT, ECP-1, JHR, MJ) (CFHOF)
 Leonard Roseth, Wisconsin (ECP-2)

Key
CA = Chicago American

CC = Chicago Chronicle

CDN = Chicago Daily News

CEJ = Chicago Evening Journal

CP = Chicago Evening Post

CRH = Chicago Record-Herald

CT = Chicago Tribune

ECP = E. C. Patterson for Collier's Weekly

JHR = J. H. Ritchie in Illustrated Outdoor News

MJ = The Minneapolis Journal

CFHOF = College Football Hall of Fame

See also
 1905 College Football All-America Team

References

All-Western team
All-Western college football teams